The Oakland East Bay Symphony (OEBS) is a leading orchestra based in Oakland, California. Michael Morgan held the position of music director and conductor from September 1990 until his death in August 2021. The Paramount Theatre has been the home of the Symphony since 1995. Bryan Nies has been Associate Conductor since 2002. The Symphony presents six programs of music during the season.

Overview

Oakland East Bay Symphony (OEBS) was founded in July 1988, when musicians from the former Oakland Symphony and the Oakland Symphony League joined together to form a new orchestra. Under Maestro Michael Morgan's direction, OEBS has become a leader in music education for young people, bringing orchestral music into schools throughout Oakland and the East Bay. More than 60,000 people attend OEBS' performances at the Paramount Theatre, at churches and senior centers, and at other community sites each year. The symphony presents both classic and innovative new works. OEBS is an important positive force in bringing together the talents and resources of diverse arts groups from the community. Whenever possible, OEBS collaborates with local ballet, opera, choral and theatrical groups and performs at community events. In June 2001, OEBS presented a special concert entitled "A Tribute to Gordon Parks" in collaboration with the Oakland Museum of California on the eve of the opening of a national touring exhibit of Mr. Parks' work. In July 2002, the OEBS collaborated with Jack London Square for a free Fourth of July Pops Concert, performed with fireworks.

In 2007, OEBS performed a musical tribute to Martin Luther King Jr. The symphony perform the West Coast premier of Petaluma-based composer Nolan Gasser's "Black Suit Blues". Based on a poem by Robert Trent Jones Jr. about the impact of King's life on the United States, the production features the symphony, chorus as well as baritone singer Robert Sims and saxophonist David Henderson. The program also included Franz Schubert's Symphony No. 9.

In early December 2007 Let Us Break Bread Together: A Holiday Celebration, Michael Morgan and the orchestra are joined by Oakland Symphony Chorus, Terrance Kelly & the Oakland Interfaith Gospel Choir, Piedmont Choirs, Mt. Eden High School Concert Choir and Klezmer ensemble Kugelplex for inspiring performances of spirituals, classical and sacred music, and other holiday favorites.

December 2007, the Oakland Ballet celebrated the 35th Anniversary of Ronn Guidi’s famous "Nutcracker" at the Paramount, with Maestro Michael Morgan conducting the music of Tchaikovsky.

American Masterworks Series

On May 18, 2007, the Oakland East Bay Symphony launched "American Masterworks Series." With its May 18, 2007, performance of George Gershwin's "Porgy and Bess" was sold out, with over 3000 patrons in attendance. One outstanding feature of the production was the appearance by the 120-voice Oakland Symphony Chorus directed by Lynne Morrow. The Porgy’s signature tune were performed, "Summertime," "Oh, I Got Plenty o' Nuttin'," and "It Ain't Necessarily So." Casting included bass (Porgy) James Monroe Iglehart, soprano (Bess) Dara Rahming, tenor Trente Morant, tenor Kalil Wilson, baritone Milton Williams, and baritone Joseph Wright.

The second offering of "American Masterworks Series" continues with another composer who blurs the line between high and popular art, Stephen Sondheim. Follies (1971) will be performed in concert version in May 2008. The concert version will include all of the popular songs, including "Broadway Baby", "Losing My Mind" and "Could I Leave You?"

Awards and recognition

Selective discography

Footnotes

External links
 Oakland East Bay Symphony official website
 Oakland Ballet
 Oakland Symphony Chorus

Musical groups from Oakland, California
Tourist attractions in Oakland, California
Musical groups established in 1988
Symphony orchestras
1988 establishments in California
Orchestras based in California